This List of Florida Gators women's golfers on the LPGA Tour includes notable athletes who played for the Florida Gators women's golf team that represents the University of Florida in Gainesville, Florida, and who currently play or have played golf professionally.  These alumnae of the University of Florida played on the LPGA Tour or competed in other major LPGA-affiliated tours and tournaments.

See also 

 Florida Gators
 List of Florida Gators men's golfers on the PGA Tour
 List of University of Florida alumni
 List of University of Florida Athletic Hall of Fame members

 
Golfers, women's